The 1909 All-Western college football team consists of American football players selected to the All-Western teams chosen by various selectors for the 1909 college football season.

All-Western selections

Ends
 Harlan Page, Chicago (ECP-1, WE)
 James Dean, Wisconsin (ECP-2, WE)
 Walter Henry Rademacher, Minnesota (ECP-1)
 Frederick L. Conklin, Michigan (ECP-2)

Tackles
 James Walker, Minnesota (ECP-1, WE)
 George Philbrook, Notre Dame (ECP-1)
 Ralph Dimmick, Notre Dame (WE)
 F. E. Boyle, Wisconsin (ECP-2)
 Homer W. Dutter, Indiana (ECP-2)

Guards
 Albert Benbrook, Michigan (ECP-1, WE) (CFHOF)
 Sam Dolan, Notre Dame (ECP-1, WE)
 Glenn D. Butzer, Illinois (ECP-2)
 Harry W. Powers, Minnesota (ECP-2)

Centers
 Andrew W. Smith, Michigan (ECP-2, WE)
 Henry E. Farnum, Minnesota (ECP-1)

Quarterbacks
 John McGovern, Minnesota (ECP-1, WE) (CFHOF)
 Otto E. Seiler, Illinois (ECP-2)

Halfbacks
 Dave Allerdice, Michigan (ECP-1, WE)
 Joe Magidsohn, Michigan (ECP-1, WE)
 William Lucas Crawley, Chicago (ECP-2)
 Harry "Red" Miller, Notre Dame (ECP-2)

Fullbacks 
 Earle T. Pickering, Minnesota (ECP-1)
 Robert E. Vaughan, Notre Dame (WE)
 John Wilce, Wisconsin (ECP-2) (CFHOF)

Key
Bold = consensus choice by a majority of the selectors

ECP = E. C. Patterson for Collier's Weekly

WE = Walter Eckersall in the Chicago Tribune

CFHOF = College Football Hall of Fame

See also
1909 College Football All-America Team

References

1909 Western Conference football season
All-Western college football teams